1954 Kukarkin is an asteroid and slow rotator on an eccentric orbit from the outer regions of the asteroid belt. It was discovered on 15 August 1952, by Russian astronomer Pelageya Shajn at Simeiz Observatory on the Crimean peninsula. It was named after astronomer Boris Kukarkin.

Orbit and classification 

Kukarkin orbits the Sun in the outer main-belt at a distance of 2.0–3.9 AU once every 5.03 years (1,838 days). Its orbit has an eccentricity of 0.31 and an inclination of 15° with respect to the ecliptic. No precoveries were taken prior to its discovery.

Naming 

This minor planet is named after stellar astronomer Boris Vasilyevich Kukarkin (1909–1977), a well-known specialist for variable stars, the structure of stellar systems, and professor at Moscow State University. Kukarkin started and edited the General Catalogue of Variable Stars that was first published in 1948. He also served as vice-president of the Astronomical Council of Academy of Sciences of the USSR as well as of the International Astronomical Union and was the president of its Commission 27. The approved naming citation was published by the Minor Planet Center on 1 June 1980.

Physical characteristics 

Kukarkin is a slow rotator, with a long period of  hours, measured at Los Algarrobos Observatory, Uruguay (I38) during a favorable opposition in 2012. The well-defined rotational lightcurve had brightness variation of  magnitude.

References

External links 
 Asteroid Lightcurve Database (LCDB), query form (info )
 Dictionary of Minor Planet Names, Google books
 Asteroids and comets rotation curves, CdR – Observatoire de Genève, Raoul Behrend
 Discovery Circumstances: Numbered Minor Planets (1)-(5000) – Minor Planet Center
 
 

001954
Discoveries by Pelageya Shajn
Named minor planets
001954
19520815